Pontelandolfo is an Italian town and comune in the Sannio Hills in the province of Benevento, approximately halfway between Naples and Campobasso.

Geography
Pontelandolfo is located on a mountainous area of Italy. The area that surrounds Pontelandolfo has a wide range of altitudes (400-1,017 meters), with the center of population situated at 525 meters.

There are three prominent mountains that surround Pontelandolfo. These include Mount Calvello, which has an altitude of 1,017 meters, Toppo Mangialardo (917 m) and Mount Forgioso (850 m).

History
The name of the village comes from the legendary Pontis Landulphi, or the Bridge of Landolfo, named after a soldier who died defending the bridge against the Romans while the villagers fled to safety, an event memorialized in the village's crest. The bridge is believed to have spanned the Alenta Creek, whose source is the Calore Irpino.

According to local ancient folklore, the regional surname Guerrera derived from the Latin spelling Gverrera meaning warrior or man of war, is said to have origins dating back to the soldier who died defending the bridge against the Romans. The Guerrera clan for centuries inhabited the fertile lands south of the Alenta Creek stretching between San Lupo and Pontelandolfo centred in and around the current village of Giallonardo.

Pontelandolfo is mostly remembered as the location, along with Casalduni, of a massacre of largely civilian population by the Piedmontese occupation troops in 1861.

Many villagers emigrated to the United States, with a large community settling in and around Waterbury, Connecticut, where they founded the Pontelandolfo Community Club. A large number also moved to Canada, specifically to the city of Montreal. A significant number also emigrated to Australia in the period post World War 2 to the early 1970s and settled predominantly on Sydney's North Shore and Eastern Suburbs area, and whose family surnames include: Guerrera; Orsini; Mucciacciaro; Rubbo; and Mancini. A small number also settled in and around Melbourne. The early Australian emigrants worked in the Queensland sugar cane fields before moving to Sydney where they settled and were later joined by their extended families.

Main sights
Medieval tower (12th century)
Church of Annunziata Antica (15th century)
Chapel of San Rocco (17th-18th centuries)

Economy
Much of the surrounding area of Pontelandolfo (14.91 km2) is used for agriculture thanks to the fertility of the ground, which was already well known by the ancient Greeks. The primary use of the land is for olive-tree orchards, pastures and for the culture of cereals.

Twin towns 

Pontelandolfo is twinned with:
 Waterbury, USA

References

External links
 Official website
 Pontelandolfo News